Michael S. Moore is an American lawyer, focusing on constitutional law, criminal law, and jurisprudence. He is currently the Charles R. Walgreen Chair at University of Illinois.

Moore graduated from South Eugene High School, in Eugene, Oregon, in 1961. He earned his A.B. in Political Science from the University of Oregon, earned a J.D. from Harvard Law School in 1967, and earned an S.J.D. from Harvard University in  1978.

Before his current academic position, Moore was formerly the Leon Meltzer Professor of Law and Professor of Philosophy at the University of Pennsylvania Law School (1989-2000), Robert Kingsley Chair at University of Southern California, Warren Distinguished Professor of Law at University of San Diego, William Minor Lile Distinguished Visiting Professor of Law at University of Virginia, Mason Ladd Distinguished Visiting Professor at University of Iowa, and the Florence Ragatz Visiting Professorship at Yale Law School.

References

Year of birth missing (living people)
Living people
University of Illinois faculty
American lawyers
Yale Law School faculty
University of Pennsylvania Law School faculty
University of San Diego faculty
University of Southern California faculty
University of Oregon alumni
Harvard Law School alumni
American scholars of constitutional law
Scholars of criminal law
Jurisprudence academics
Philosophers of law